Anatolian Seljuks (also called Seljuks of Rum and Seljuks of Turkey) was a former dynasty in Turkey.
Süleyman, the founder of the dynasty, was a member of the Seljuk dynasty. His grand father was Seljuk Bey's elder son.  In 1077, after capturing Nicaea (modern İznik), Süleyman founded his kingdom as a vassal of the main Seljuk Empire. However, the Seljuks of Anatolia soon became independent of the main empire, and their state survived till the beginning of the 14th century.

Legend
The colors of the boxes are as follows
:
:
:

|

  

 

 

|
Important events
.
.
.
.
.
.
.
.
.
.
.
.
.
.
.
Battle of Malazgirt
.
Establishment
.
.
.
First Crusade
.
Second Crusade
.
.
Battle of Myriokephalon
Third Crusade
.
Ala ad-Din Tekish endedGreat Seljuk Empire
.
.
.
.
Zenith
Battle of Yassıçimen
.
.
Babai Revolt
Battle of Kösedağ
.
Triple reign
.
.
.
.
.
.
.
Disestablishment

Footnotes

References

Family trees
Sultans of Rum
History of Turkey
Dynasty genealogy